Suvad Grabus (born 14 December 1981) is a Bosnian-Herzegovinian footballer.

Club career
Grabus previously played for Slovenian club Interblock and for Bulgarian side Ludogorets Razgrad. He spent the final part of his career in the Austrian lower leagues.

References

External links
Profile at Prvaliga 

1981 births
Living people
People from Travnik
Association football fullbacks
Bosnia and Herzegovina footballers
Bosnia and Herzegovina under-21 international footballers
NK Triglav Kranj players
NK Travnik players
NK Čelik Zenica players
NK IB 1975 Ljubljana players
NK Drava Ptuj players
HŠK Zrinjski Mostar players
PFC Ludogorets Razgrad players
NK Krka players
Premier League of Bosnia and Herzegovina players
Slovenian PrvaLiga players
First Professional Football League (Bulgaria) players
Austrian Landesliga players
Bosnia and Herzegovina expatriate footballers
Expatriate footballers in Slovenia
Bosnia and Herzegovina expatriate sportspeople in Slovenia
Expatriate footballers in Bulgaria
Bosnia and Herzegovina expatriate sportspeople in Bulgaria
Expatriate footballers in Austria
Bosnia and Herzegovina expatriate sportspeople in Austria